Florian Mayer (born 4 March 1998) is a German professional footballer who plays as a defender for Eerste Divisie club Roda JC.

Career 
Mayer started playing football in the youth of FC Schalke 04 and moved to VfL Bochum in 2014, for whom he played 26 games (one goal) in the B-Junioren Bundesliga West and then 22 games in the A-Junioren Bundesliga West. In 2016, he joined Borussia Mönchengladbach's U19s, and since the 2017–18 season, he has been predominantly used in Borussia's U23s.

He made his first appearance in the professional squad for the Rhineland derby between 1. FC Köln and Borussia Mönchengladbach on 14 January 2018. However, the central defender did not yet make an appearance in his team's 2–1 defeat. Florian Mayer made his first league debut on 1 April 2018 (matchday 28). In the match against FSV Mainz 05, he was substituted for the injured Nico Elvedi in the 72nd minute of the match, but did not make more than one appearance for the licensed team. Several serious injuries set the centre-back back, including two cruciate ligament ruptures.

For the 2021–22 season, Mayer moved to the Netherlands on a free transfer to second-division club Roda JC Kerkrade at the end of his contract, signing a contract that would run until 30 June 2022. Shortly after signing, he suffered serious injuries in training.

References

External links
 

1998 births
Living people
German footballers
Footballers from Essen
Association football defenders
Germany youth international footballers
Borussia Mönchengladbach II players
Borussia Mönchengladbach players
Bundesliga players
Regionalliga players
Eerste Divisie players
Roda JC Kerkrade players
German expatriate footballers
German expatriate sportspeople in the Netherlands
Expatriate footballers in the Netherlands